Coudray may refer to:

Places
Coudray, Eure, France
Coudray, Loiret, France
Coudray, Mayenne, France
Coudray-au-Perche, in the Eure-et-Loir département, France
Coudray-Rabut, in the Calvados département, France
Le Coudray, in the Eure-et-Loir département, France
Le Coudray-Macouard, in the Maine-et-Loire département, France
Le Coudray-Montceaux, in the Essonne département, France
Le Coudray-Saint-Germer, in the Oise département, France
Le Coudray-sur-Thelle, in the Oise département, France

People with the surname
 Clemens Wenzeslaus Coudray (1775–1845), German neoclassical architect
 François Coudray (1678–1727) French sculptor
 Georges Coudray (1902–1998) French politician
 Tiana Coudray (born 1988) American equestrian and dancer

Other uses
 27712 Coudray, a main-belt asteroid

French-language surnames